Berchișești is a commune located in Suceava County, Romania. It is composed of two villages, namely Berchișești and Corlata.

References 

Communes in Suceava County
Localities in Southern Bukovina